"Love on Display" is a song by Australian singer Guy Sebastian, released on 25 September 2020 as the fifth single from his ninth studio album T.R.U.T.H.. Sebastian told Entertainment Focus "This song is all about expressing your love –  don't hold it back, don't hide it, wear it out there for the world to see. It's a fun song that I hope make people happy."

At the APRA Music Awards of 2022, the song was nominated for Most Performed Australian Work and Most Performed Pop Work.

Background
Upon release, Sebastian said "I knew that the song needed a certain feeling and it needed to get to a certain place where there was this energy, and I just could not get it to a point where it felt really, really right. We tried so many different versions of this song... and then I did what I always do when I'm in that situation, I flicked it onto M-Phazes [who] worked his magic and got some really great playing on there".

Music video
The music video for "Love on Display" was released on 21 October 2020. It was directed by ARIA Award winning director, James Chappell.

Charts

References

2020 singles
Guy Sebastian songs
Sony Music Australia singles
Songs written by Guy Sebastian
Songs written by Julian Bunetta